Haploa clymene, the Clymene moth, is a moth of the tiger moth subfamily - Arctiinae, tribe Arctiini. The species was first described by Peter Brown in 1776. It is found in eastern North America.

Description
The forewing is creamy yellow with a partial brown-black border that extends inward from the inner margin near anal angle. The hindwing is yellow orange with one or two brown-black spots. The wingspan is 40–55 mm.

Life cycle
The spiny larva is brownish black with a yellow middorsal stripe. The larvae overwinter and mature in the spring and early summer. The larvae feed on Eupatorium, oak, peach and willow. The Clymene moth has one brood per year.

References
Wagner, David L. (2005). Caterpillars of Eastern North America. Princeton University Press, Princeton, New Jersey. 
Covell, Charles V. Jr. (2005). Moths of Eastern North America. Virginia Museum of Natural History, Martinsville, Virginia.

External links

Callimorphina
Moths of North America
Moths described in 1776
Taxa named by Peter Brown (naturalist)